Demasq Kaja (died  August 25, 1327) was a member of the Chobanid family during the middle of the fourteenth century. He was the son of Coban.

During the 1320s, Coban accumulated a great deal of power as an amir of the Ilkhanate. While technically serving the Ilkhan Abu Sa'id, he was the effective power behind the throne. He therefore divided up Persia between himself and his sons. Demasq became viceroy of Azerbaijan and Iraq. In addition, he gained the use of the powers that the vizier Rukn al-Din Sa'in had been invested with.

During 1326 and 1327, both Coban and Rukn were campaigning in Khurasan. With the two gone, Demasq was effectively in control back at the Ilkhanid capital of Sultaniya. Abu Sa'id had resented the power of Coban and his offspring for some time by now, and he plotted their fall. Since Demasq was the most imminent threat, Abu Sa'id chose to deal with him first. When it was discovered that Demasq had been having with an affair with a former concubine of the late Ilkhan Öljeitü's, Abu Sa'id used this as a pretext for moving against him. Demasq, trapped in Sultaniyah, tried to escape, but was killed in the process, in August 1327. He was the first of the Chobanids to be killed; several others would soon follow.

Family
Consort
Demasq had one consort:
Tursin Khatun (killed 1324), daughter of Irinjin Kurkan and Konchak Khatun, daughter of Tekuder Khan;

Daughters
Demasq had four daughters;
Dilshad Khatun, married firstly to Abu Sa'id Bahadur Khan, son of Öljaitü, married secondly to Shaikh Hasan Buzurg;
Sultan Bakht Khatun, married firstly to Amir Ilkhan, son of Shaikh Hasan Buzurg, married secondly to Masud Shah Inju;
Dendi Shah Khatun, married to Shaikh Ali Khushji, and mother of Missar Malik;
Alam Shah Khatun, married to Sultan Shah, son of Nikruz;

References

Chobanids
1327 deaths
Year of birth unknown